An educational program is a program written by the institution or ministry of education which determines the learning progress of each subject in all the stages of formal education.

See also 
Philosophy of education
Curriculum

References